Persimfans was a conductorless orchestra in Moscow in the Soviet Union that was founded by Lev Tseitlin and existed between 1922 and 1932. Its name is an abbreviation for Pervïy Simfonicheskiy Ansambl' bez Dirizhyora (First Conductorless Symphony Ensemble).

Philosophy and Music 
Persimfans was formed during the early years of the Soviet Union.  Because there was no conductor, major decisions were undertaken by committees and all members of the orchestra had to be familiar with the entire score.  The quality of playing amazed many contemporaries who believed there must be a conductor hidden away behind the stage.  Persimfans also inspired the formation of other conductorless orchestras throughout the Soviet Union and the West in the 1920s, but most only lasted for a few years.

Contemporary Revival 
In 2008, a contemporary revival of Persimfans was created by Konstantin Dudalov-Kashuro, Peter Aidu and Gregory Krotenko under the aegis of the Moscow School of Dramatic Art's Music Laboratory.  In 2014 Persimfans was awarded the Sergei Kuryokhin Contemporary Art Award.

References

History of the greatest conductorless orchestra
Conductorless Orchestra 'Persimfans' Sees Contemporary Revival

Musical groups established in 1922
Musical groups disestablished in 1932
Russian symphony orchestras